Brauss or Brauß may refer to:

People
 Arthur Brauss (born 1936), German actor
 Elisabeth Brauß (born 1995), German pianist
 Martin Brauß (born 1958), German pianist

Other
 "BRAUSS" Dr. B.R. Ambedkar University of Social Sciences), university in Madhya Pradesh, India